In Roman mythology, Securitas was the goddess of security and stability, especially the security of the Roman Empire. On coinage Securitas was usually depicted leaning on a column.

References

Roman goddesses
Personifications in Roman mythology